Flummery is a starch-based, sweet, soft dessert pudding known to have been popular in Britain and Ireland from the seventeenth to nineteenth centuries. The word has also been used for other semi-set desserts.

History and etymology
The name is first known in Gervase Markham's 1623 Countrey Contentments, or English Huswife (new ed.) vi. 222  "From this small Oat-meale, by oft steeping it in water and clensing it, and then boyling it to a thicke and stiffe jelly, is made that excellent dish of meat which is so esteemed in the West parts of this Kingdome, which they call Wash-brew, and in Chesheire and Lankasheire they call it Flamerie or Flumerie".

The name is derived from the Welsh word for a similar dish made from sour oatmeal and husks, which is of unknown origin. It is also attested in variant forms such as thlummery or flamery in 17th and 18th century English. The word "flummery" later came to have generally pejorative connotations of a bland, empty, and unsatisfying food. From this use, "flummery" developed the meaning of empty compliments, unsubstantial talk or writing, and nonsense.

Australasian "flummery"

In Australia and New Zealand, post World War II, flummery was the name given to a different foodstuff, a mousse dessert made with beaten evaporated milk, sugar, and gelatine. Also made using jelly crystals, mousse flummery became established as an inexpensive alternative to traditional cream-based mousse. In the Queensland town of Longreach, it was a staple food in the 1970s and in the New South Wales town of Forbes, it was a fall-back dessert in the 1950s. The American writer Bill Bryson described flummery as an early form of the blancmange dessert known in the United States.

See also

References

External links 
 

British desserts
Irish cuisine
Australian desserts
New Zealand desserts
Puddings